Antsalova is a district in western Madagascar. It is a part of Melaky Region and borders the districts of Maintirano in north, Morafenobe in northeast, Miandrivazo in east and Belon'i Tsiribihina in south.

The district is crossed by the  National Road No.8, though it is practicable only in the dry season.

Communes
The district is further divided into five communes:

 Antsalova
 Bekopaka
 Masoarivo
 Soahany
 Trangahy

Rivers
The Manambolo River.

References

Districts of Melaky